Daws Road is a major arterial road in the central southern suburbs of Adelaide. It runs east–west between Marion Road in the west and Goodwood Road in the east. Pasadena High School and the Repatriation Hospital are on Daws Road.

Route
Daws Road starts at the intersection with Oaklands Road and Marion Road in Ascot Park. It heads east as a four-lane, dual-carriageway road. It goes underneath the railway bridges of the Seaford railway line, then crosses the Flinders railway line a short distance further east. It continues east to cross South Road. It ends at the intersection with Goodwood and Springbank Roads in Daw Park.

History
The section of Daws Road west of South Road was previously known as Sweetmans Road, with the road ending at Railway Terrace, Ascot Park.

In 2019, the government proposed to realign the intersection of Daws and Goodwood Roads to create a new four-way intersection, eliminating the dogleg and improving traffic flow between them. Construction started in January 2021 and was completed four months later in April 2021, for a cost of $61 million. Half was funded by the South Australian government and half by the Federal government.

Public transport 
The road is serviced by the 241 bus between Marion Road and West Street (Ascot Park). The 213 bus runs between Beaumont Street (Clovelly Park) and Goodwood Road. The 297 bus travels from Beaumont Street to Winston Avenue (Melrose Park).

Major intersections

References 

Roads in Adelaide